Taylor Corporation is a privately owned printing company based in North Mankato, Minnesota. Established in 1975 by Glen Taylor.   The company comprises more than 80 subsidiaries and employs more than 10,000 workers across the United Kingdom, Philippines, Mexico, India, China, Canada, Bulgaria and 32 U.S. states. 

As of 2016, Taylor Corporation is considered the third largest graphic communications company in the country, with only RR Donnelley and Quad/Graphics achieving larger revenues.

History
Taylor Corporation was founded in 1975 by Glen Taylor when he purchased Carlson Wedding Service located in North Mankato, Minnesota. Bill Carlson, the previous owner, had decided to sell the company in preparation for retirement. Taylor had worked for and alongside Carlson since 1959.

Carlson Craft has become Taylor’s largest company and is the leading wholesale printing company in the U.S.

In June 2015, it was announced that Taylor Corporation would be acquiring Standard Register for a reported $307 million.

In 2016, Deb Taylor was appointed to serve as the chief executive officer of Taylor Corporation, with Glen Taylor remaining active in the company as its chairman.

In 2019, Deb Taylor stepped down and Glen Taylor reassumed the role of CEO until appointing Charlie Whitaker as the chief executive officer in 2020. Glen Taylor remains chairman of the company.

Taylor Corporation

Taylor Corporation has grown by acquiring 187 companies in the graphic arts industry since its inception in 1975.

One of the largest was its acquisition on June 17, 2015[3], of Standard Register Co., founded in Dayton, Ohio in 1912, for a reported $307 million. Brothers John and William Sherman, along with local Dayton inventor Theodore Shirmer, founded Standard Register Co. to sell the pinfeed autographic register, a device invented by Shirmer. The device enabled multiple copies of printed forms to be fed through the machine using a hand-cranked wooden cylinder. Over the next century, Standard Register rose to prominence as one of the largest printed communications companies in the United States.

Several months after the transaction was complete, Standard Register was re-branded as Taylor Corporation's new go-to-market subsidiary, Taylor Communications. Less than one year following the acquisition of Standard Register, Taylor Communications announced its intentions to purchase Staples Print Solutions, the commercial print division of Staples Inc. The acquisition added 10 commercial print facilities to the company's manufacturing footprint.

Another significant acquisition was Curtis 1000, founded in St. Paul, Minnesota, in 1882 by Henry Russell Curtis. Curtis Printing Company was incorporated on September 9, 1886, and grew to become a leading provider of direct mail, labels, promotional products and other printed items for the financial industry. Taylor acquired Curtis 1000, Inc. in 2002.

In 2021, the business discontinued using the Taylor Communications and Curtis 1000 brand names and now refers to this part of its business as "Taylor".

As of 2022, the company operates 65 manufacturing facilities worldwide, with more than 3.3 million square feet of production and warehousing space.

References

External links

Taylor Communications

Privately held companies based in Minnesota
Business services companies established in 1975
1975 establishments in Minnesota
Printing companies of the United States